Commerce is a city in Hunt County, Texas, United States, situated on the eastern edge of North Texas, in the heart of the Texas Blackland Prairies. Commerce is the second-largest city in Hunt County, with a population of 9,090 at the 2020 census. The city is home to Texas A&M University–Commerce, a four-year university of more than 12,000 students that has been in the town since 1894. Commerce is one of the smallest college towns in Texas.

History

The town of Commerce was formed when two merchants named William Jernigan and Josiah Jackson established a trading post and mercantile store where the present-day downtown area is. The rural area just to the northeast was an open prairie originally known as Cow Hill. The town was established in 1872 and named "Commerce" due to the thriving economic activity among the cotton fields and ideal farm and ranch lands between the Middle and South Sulphur rivers on the rich, black gumbo prairie in northeast Hunt County. The town incorporated in 1885. Two years later, a railroad was built through Commerce to transport merchandise from Fort Worth, and nine years later, William L. Mayo, a college educator, moved East Texas Normal College from the northeast Texas town of Cooper to Commerce after the original school in Cooper was destroyed in a fire. Mayo continued as president of the college, now known as Texas A&M University–Commerce, until his death in 1917 and is buried on the campus grounds.

Commerce was named the "Bois d'Arc Capital of Texas" (pronounced "bow-dark") by the Texas Legislature because of its location in the geographic center of the indigenous range of the bois d'arc tree. The second largest bois d'arc tree in Texas, "Big Max", recognized by the National Forests Famous and Historic Trees, is located within the city limits. Held every September, the annual Bois d'Arc Bash pays homage to the native trees which played a vital part in the frontier days, providing foundations, fences and weapons of the Native Americans. The Bash celebrates with arts & crafts vendors, food, parade, kids' game area, pageant, wine, musical entertainment, 5K run, and car & truck show.

Geography

Commerce is located in northeastern Hunt County at  (33.244959, −95.899957).

The Middle Sulphur River, part of the Red River watershed, runs past the north side of Commerce and forms part of its northern border.

Climate 
Commerce's climate is part of the humid subtropical region. The temperature varies greatly throughout the year. Commerce has hot, humid and dry summers, typical of much of Texas, and above average spring temperatures. Commerce has cooler fall and winter temperatures, with higher wind chills due to its northern location and location on a natural prairie. During the spring is the strongest part of the storm season as thunderstorms are very common and tornadoes have been known to form in and around the area.

Demographics

As of the 2020 United States census, there were 9,090 people, 2,853 households, and 1,620 families residing in the city. The population density was 1,080.85 people per square mile (417.54/km). There were 3,589 housing units at an average density of 426.75 per square mile (164.85/km). There were 2,853 households, out of which 18.9% had children under the age of 18 living with them, 38.2% were married couples living together, and 36.5% had a female householder with no spouse present. The average family size was 3.34.

Age demographic: 6.5% under the age of 5, 18.9% under the age of 18, and 81.1% percent over the age of 18. People aged 65 or older make up 8.1% of the population. The median age was 23.9 years.

The median income for a household in the city was $34,946, and the median income for a family was $52,188. About 32.1% of the population were below the poverty line, including 33.6% of those under age 18 and 12.6% of those age 65 or over.

Economy
Due to being a rural college town with proximity to Dallas, Commerce has an economy that remained steady for years, with gradual increases with new businesses opening and others being renovated. Most of the bigger businesses of the town surround the local university, and the university's student body is bigger than the town itself. The downtown area is approximately one mile from the university and is the hub for town festivities. The downtown area includes bars, dining, a fashion retailer, an office supplies retailer, a thrift shop, real estate offices, tax preparation offices, an insurance agency, the Chamber of Commerce, banks, and loft-style living.

Healthcare
Commerce is home to Hunt Regional Medical Center, a Level IV Emergency Room and Trauma Center. The hospital was once part of the Dallas-based Presbyterian Health System, but changed hands around 2010. The main medical center is in nearby Greenville, and Commerce also has three primary care physicians' offices, one chiropractor, a prenatal clinic, two dental offices, and a physical therapy center.

Employment

Education

Primary and secondary education

The city is served by the Commerce Independent School District. CISD currently operates the following schools:

 Commerce Elementary (Pre-K–2)
 AC Williams Elementary (3–5)
 Commerce Middle School (6–8)
 Commerce High School (9–12)

Post-secondary education

Commerce is home to Texas A&M University–Commerce (formerly known as East Texas State University), a fully accredited and ranked university that offers over 100 different majors, with an enrollment of 12,302 students, 7,808 undergraduates, and 4,494 graduate students. A&M-Commerce was founded in 1889 at its original location in Cooper, Texas, but moved to Commerce after burning down in 1894. The university is ranked #1 in the state of Texas for teaching education and 13th in the nation, in addition to having a highly ranked graduate school. The university also remains as the fifth longest continuous operating university in the state of Texas.

The Texas Legislature designated Paris Junior College as the junior college for students in most of Hunt County, including Commerce. PJC has campuses in Paris (40 miles away), Greenville (15 miles away), and Sulphur Springs (25 miles away).

Sports

High school sports

Commerce High School is the only high school in Commerce. They are known as the Commerce Tigers and compete at the 3A level in UIL sports. The Tigers compete in football (boys), volleyball (girls), basketball (boys and girls), softball (girls), baseball (boys), track and field (boys and girls), cross country (boys and girls), powerlifting (boys and girls), tennis (boys and girls), and golf (boys and girls). The football team has two state titles from 1999 and 2001. Commerce-Norris High School (defunct) won the state championship for basketball in 1964.

Collegiate sports

The A&M–Commerce Lions compete in NCAA Division I FCS and are a member of the Southland Conference. The A&M-Commerce Lions compete in football (men), volleyball (women), basketball (men and women), soccer (women), softball (women), golf (men and women), track and field (men and women), and cross country (men and women). Football is very popular among the university as well as the town, as fans from surrounding cities including Greenville and Sulphur Springs will come out to support the A&M-Commerce Lions football team, and the average attendance at football games is over 6,000. The A&M-Commerce Lions have earned numerous conference titles in nearly every sport that they compete in. In addition to this they've also earned six national titles, men's basketball (1954–1955), men's golf (1965), football (1972, 2017), men's tennis (1972, 1978).

Beginning in 2022, the athletics programs at Texas A&M University-Commerce will begin a four-year transition period to NCAA Division I and will join the Southland Conference in all sports effective July 1, 2022.

Media

KETR serves as the radio station for the city of Commerce, Texas A&M University–Commerce, Hunt County, and surrounding cities. The station was founded in 1975 at the A&M-Commerce campus where it still remains today. KETR is a 100,000 watt radio station that can reach up to 75 miles away, the radio frequency is 88.9 FM in honor of the year 1889 which is the year the university was founded. The station provides news, music, and sports for its listeners. In fact the station has two NPR talk shows. Commerce High School football games are broadcast on KETR, as well as A&M–Commerce Lions football and basketball games. KGVL in nearby Greenville also has a strong presence due to the proximity of the two cities. Commerce is served by the Dallas/Fort Worth Television Stations on local cable and also regular programming. Commerce residents have three newspapers that serve the city, The Dallas Morning News, (Daily) The Greenville Herald-Banner, (Daily) and the Commerce Journal. (Weekly) Texas A&M University-Commerce also has its own student-led newspaper, The East Texan (weekly).

Attractions

Northeast Texas Children's Museum

The city of Commerce is home to the Northeast Texas Children's Museum. The museum provides playful and creative learning experiences for children. There are many hands-on exhibits and programs that cater to children between ages 2 through 10. Many school districts from the Dallas/Fort Worth Metroplex and the Northeast Texas area visit the museum.

Jim Chapman Lake

Jim Chapman Lake (formerly known as Cooper Lake) is located roughly 25 minutes east of Commerce, between Cooper and Sulphur Springs. Boating, swimming, and fishing are available at Jim Chapman Lake. Cooper Lake State Park is located along the northern shore of the lake. The park contains several picnic areas, campgrounds and a large swimming area on Jim Chapman Lake. The park also contains several hiking and equestrian trails.

Transportation

Commerce is served by the following highways:
  Texas State Highway 11 – An east–west route through Commerce that connects with Sulphur Springs and Winnsboro to the east, and Wolfe City, Whitewright and Sherman to the west. Runs concurrent with Loop 178 along the south side of the university on a street known locally as "Culver Street" and then runs concurrent with Highway 24 before heading west towards Wolfe City.
  Texas State Highway 24 – Major north–south route that runs through the city of Commerce and the University. It connects with Campbell and Interstate 30 to the south and with Cooper and Paris to the north. Most of the major businesses of Commerce line Highway 24. It is the only highway in Commerce that has a frontage road. It is a four-lane divided highway.
 Texas State Highway 50 – Serves the northwest part of Commerce, particularly the area by Commerce Municipal Airport. Connects with Ladonia to the north. Formerly, the highway ran concurrent with Highway 24 from Interstate 30; this portion of the highway was reassigned in 2009. 
  Texas State Highway 224 – Is the Commerce-to-Greenville route, as it is the only highway that directly connects the two largest cities in Hunt county. It also goes through Neylandville before reaching its terminus in Greenville.
  Texas State Highway Loop 178 – a 3/4 loop that runs a semi-circle around Commerce. It runs concurrent with Highway 11 along Culver Street south of the university before the junction with Highway 24, and after the junction it continues west towards Highway 224.
 Texas Farm to Market Road 71 – Serves the northeast rural area of Commerce and continues into Hopkins County, going through some of the smaller rural communities.
  Texas Farm to Market Road 2874 – Heads toward some unincorporated parts of Hunt County from a Junction with highway 224.
  Texas Farm to Market Road 3218 – Serves the southeast area of Commerce, running through a small industrial and rural area. It also passes by a few Commerce ISD schools.
   Business 224–A business route of highway 224 through Commerce along Live Oak Street, Main Street and Park Street.
   Business 11–A business route of highway 11 through Commerce along Maple Street, Park Street, and Wolfe City Drive, this route was formerly a part of Highway 11 before it was rerouted to run concurrent with Loop 178 and Highway 24.

Commerce is the proposed terminus in the third and final stage for the proposed Blacklands Turnpike, a toll road that would run from far northeastern Dallas County, through Collin and Rockwall counties, as a faster way to get from Dallas to the major cities in Hunt County.

Commerce is served by Commerce Municipal Airport.

Public transit called "The Connection" serves Commerce and all of Hunt County. The Connection operates Monday through Friday from 7 am to 7 pm. Reservations have to be made one day in advance, and the transit charges $2 ($4 round trip) if the passenger is traveling to a place within the same community or city, and $3 ($6 round trip) if the passenger is traveling from one city or community to another within Hunt County. The Connection will also take Hunt County residents to Dallas, as a round trip only: passengers are charged $34, and a minimum of three passengers is required.

Notable landmark

The most notable landmark of the city of Commerce is Samuel H. Whitley Hall, a 12-story building on the A&M-Commerce campus. It is the tallest building between Dallas and Texarkana. The building is named in honor of former university president Samuel Whitley, who served from 1924 to 1946. The  building serves as a dormitory for traditional freshmen on campus.

Notable people
 George C. Butte, Republican candidate for governor of Texas
 Claire Chennault, World War II general and noted war hero
 Ben Kweller, rock musician who penned a song called "Commerce, TX" that was loosely based on Kweller's time living in a duplex near college students
 Larry Lemanski, director of the Biomedical Institute for Regenerative Research at Texas A&M-Commerce
 Adam Kelly Ward, convicted murderer of code enforcement officer Michael Walker in 2005; executed in March 2016
 Wade Wilson, former All-Pro NFL quarterback and former quarterbacks coach for the Dallas Cowboys

References

External links

 City of Commerce official website
 Commerce Independent School District
 Texas A&M University-Commerce
 A&M-Commerce Lions
 KETR

Dallas–Fort Worth metroplex
Cities in Texas
Cities in Hunt County, Texas
Populated places established in 1872
1872 establishments in Texas